Josh García (born 28 July 1993) is a professional footballer who plays as a midfielder for the club Oklahoma City Energy. Born in the United States, he represents the Dominican Republic national team.

Professional career
A troubled youth raised by a single mother, García began playing soccer as a youth to get away from trouble after ending up in a juvenile center for delinquents. He was a member of the varsity team at Grant High School in Oklahoma City. He was scouted by colleges, and played at Northern Oklahoma College for 2 years, before transferring to the Friends Falcons until 2016.

García broke his foot before joining Friends University, and again shortly after he was recovering. Struggling with depression, he took a break to his hometown only to find more problems when his brother was incarcerated.  García turned to drinking and attempted suicide. After this depressive episode, García vowed to prevent his family from further suffering and returned to school and soccer with renewed focus. After graduating college, he only played soccer recreationally and got a job as a service rep for Lincare.

In January 2018, he joined the open tryouts for OKC Energy FC.  He ended up joining their U23 team, and eventually captained them. On 10 January 2019, García signed for the senior OKC Energy FC squad for the 2019 season.

International career
García was born in the United States, and is of Dominican descent. He made his professional debut for the Dominican Republic national football team in a 1-0 friendly over win Guadeloupe on 15 February 2019.

International goals
Scores and results list the Dominican Republic's goal tally first.

References

External links
 
 Friends Athletics Profile
 OKC Energy U23

1993 births
Living people
American soccer players
American sportspeople of Dominican Republic descent
Citizens of the Dominican Republic through descent
Association football midfielders
Dominican Republic footballers
Dominican Republic international footballers
Friends University alumni
Junior college men's soccer players in the United States
OKC Energy FC players
Soccer players from Massachusetts
Soccer players from Oklahoma
Sportspeople from Oklahoma City
USL Championship players